Hahnemann Hospital is a formerly independent hospital located in Worcester, Massachusetts.  The facility is now part of the UMass Memorial Medical Center.

The hospital now features a 9-room operating room surgery center that performs eye surgery,  hand and foot procedures, and other surgeries.

Hospitals in Worcester, Massachusetts